An intellectual property (IP) infringement is the infringement or violation of an intellectual property right. There are several types of intellectual property rights, such as copyrights, patents, trademarks, industrial designs, and trade secrets. Therefore, an intellectual property infringement may for instance be one of the following:

 Copyright infringement, encompassing for example a software copyright infringement
 Patent infringement
 Trademark infringement
 Design infringement
 Cybersquatting

Identifying IP infringement 
Techniques to detect (or deter) intellectual property infringement include:
 Fictitious entry, such as:
 Fictitious dictionary entry. An example is Esquivalience included in the New Oxford American Dictionary (NOAD)
 Trap street, a fictitious street included on a map for the purpose of "trapping" potential copyright violators of the map
 Watermarking

Designing around a patent may in some cases constitute a way to avoid infringing it.

Companies or individuals who infringe on intellectual property rights produce counterfeit or pirated products and services. An example of a counterfeit product is if a vendor were to place a well-known logo on a piece of clothing that said company did not produce. An example of a pirated product is if an individual were to distribute unauthorized copies of a DVD for a profit of their own. In such circumstances, the law has the right to punish. Companies may seek out remedies themselves, however, "Criminal sanctions are often warranted to ensure sufficient punishment and deterrence of wrongful activity".

See also
 Brand protection
 Code of non-infringement
 Allegations of intellectual property theft by China
 Saisie-contrefaçon, in France
 World Intellectual Property Organization (WIPO)

References

External links